WR 137 is a variable Wolf-Rayet star located around 6,000 light years away from Earth in the constellation of Cygnus.

WR 137, together with WR 134 and WR 135, was one of three stars in Cygnus observed in 1867 to have unusual spectra consisting of intense emission lines rather than the more normal continuum and absorption lines.  These were the first members of the class of stars that came to be called Wolf-Rayet stars (WR stars) after Charles Wolf and Georges Rayet who discovered their unusual appearance.  It is a member of the carbon sequence of WR stars, indicated by the lack of nitrogen lines and the strength of carbon emission.  WR 137 has a spectrum with CIII emission weaker than CIV and OV weaker still, leading to the assignment of a WC7 spectral type.  The spectrum also shows emission lines of HeII and OIV.

WR 137 is a binary system, with an O9 main sequence or giant companion.  The two stars orbit every thirteen years in a mildly eccentric orbit, and there is an episode of dust production near periastron.  The inclination of the orbit is uncertain, most likely near 67° but with some analyses suggesting values around 23°.  The O star is visually brighter and more massive, but the WR star dominates the spectrum and has a higher bolometric luminosity.  Visible in the spectrum are absorption lines and some narrow emission lines, each thought to originate from the secondary star.  The line profiles suggest a decretion disc around the star, produced by its rapid rotation, which would make it the only known system containing a WR star and an Oe star.

WR 137 is about a degree away from WR 135 and the two are believed to lie at approximately the same distance from Earth within the Cygnus OB3 association. Its properties are uncertain because of the presence of the hot luminous companion. A more typical radius for a WC7 star would be , implying a hotter temperature.

The initial orbital period would have been around 1,580 days. Around  have been transferred from the primary to the secondary.

References

External links
Wolf-Rayet shells showing a spectrum of WR 135
WR134 Ring Nebula with WR 135 visible in the top left corner

Cygnus (constellation)
Wolf–Rayet stars
Cygni, V1679
099769
192641
Durchmusterung objects
Spectroscopic binaries
O-type main-sequence stars